ISO 3166-2:NZ is the entry for New Zealand in ISO 3166-2, part of the ISO 3166 standard published by the International Organization for Standardization (ISO), which defines codes for the names of the principal subdivisions (e.g., provinces or states) of all countries coded in ISO 3166.

Currently for New Zealand, ISO 3166-2 codes are defined for 16 regions and 1 special island authority

Some New Zealand outlying islands that are outside the authority of any regions are not assigned codes, specifically:
 Kermadec Islands
 New Zealand Subantarctic Islands
 Three Kings Islands

Each code consists of two parts, separated by a hyphen. The second part is three letters: regions and special island authority.

Current codes
Subdivision names are listed as in the ISO 3166-2 standard published by the ISO 3166 Maintenance Agency (ISO 3166/MA).

ISO 639-1 codes are used to represent subdivision names in the following administrative languages:
 (en): English
 (mi): Māori

Click on the button in the header to sort each column.

Changes
The following changes to the entry have been announced by the ISO 3166/MA since the first publication of ISO 3166-2 in 1998.  ISO stopped issuing newsletters in 2013.

See also
 Subdivisions of New Zealand
 FIPS region codes of New Zealand

External links
 ISO Online Browsing Platform: NZ
 Regions of New Zealand, Statoids.com

2:NZ
ISO 3166-2
New Zealand geography-related lists